El Retiro is a town and municipality in Antioquia Department, Colombia. Part of the subregion of Eastern Antioquia.

The Lycée Français de Medellin, a French international school, has its campus in El Retiro.

History

Retiro holds a unique place in world history because of Don Ignacio Castañeda and his wife, Doña Javiera Londoño who settled here in 1734. Using slaves, they exploited mines around the area. On October 11, 1766, Doña Javiera signed a will she had agreed with her husband that manumitted 140 slaves upon her death and gave them the most productive of the El Guarzo mines.

Natural Attractions

San Sebastián La Castellana Ecological Reserve is located between El Retiro and Envigado. It preserves 200 hectares of tropical rainforest.

References

Municipalities of Antioquia Department